Nan Quan Mama is a Taiwanese music group. The name is a phrase in Mandarin to explain having strength while being gentle as a mother. They are closely tied with the well-known artist Jay Chou, but it was revealed after Lara and Chase Chang went solo that the name came from Jay's pen name when he was in high school when he started writing songs, and it was meant to mean 'Nan Quan's Mother', so it was actually a metaphor for Jay's mother. The group was nominated for Best Singing Group at the 19th Golden Melody Awards in 2008.

Each of the members contribute to composing their songs, and also sing together in most of their songs, although some of their songs are composed and sung solely by one of the members, such as the song "Crystal Dragonfly" (水晶蜻蜓) which was composed and sung by Lara. As of June 2006, they are the official spokespeople for Motorola in Taiwan.

Members

Current
 Devon Song (宋健彰) (2004–present)
 Sing Hom (洪言翔) (2015–present)
 Jaffri Cao (曹景豪) (2015–present)
 Jie Cheng (陳羽緁) (2017–present)

Former
 Yuri Chan (詹宇豪) (2004-2014)
 G-Power (鐘佐泓) (2004-2005)
 Gary Yang (楊瑞代) (2004-2005)
 Lara Veronin (梁心頤) (2005-2009)
 Chase Chang (張傑) (2005-2009)
Vera Yen (嚴正嵐) (2016)

Discography

Awards and nominations

References

External links
 Nan Quan Mama Fan Page

Taiwanese co-ed groups
Taiwanese boy bands
Mandopop musical groups